Ruth Holzhausen (born September 29, 1959) is a retired female volleyball player from Germany, who competed for West Germany at the 1984 Summer Olympics in Los Angeles, United States. There finished sixth with the national squad after a 3-0 loss in the fifth place playoff against South Korea. She is the mother of German long-jumper Lena Malkus.

References
 Ruth Holzhausen on SportsReference

1959 births
Living people
German women's volleyball players
Olympic volleyball players of West Germany
Volleyball players at the 1984 Summer Olympics